The Bhadra River (Kannada: ಭದ್ರಾ ನದಿ) is a river in Karnataka state in southern India.

The Bhadra originates at Gangamoola near Kudremukha, Western Ghats range, and flows east across the southern part of Deccan Plateau, joined by its tributaries the Somavahini near Hebbe, Thadabehalla, and Odirayanahalla. It flows through the towns of Kudremukh, Kalasa, Horanadu, Haluvalli, Balehonnur, Balehole and Narasimharajapura(N.R Pura). The Bhadra Dam is built across the river at BRP -Bhadravathi, Karnataka, which forms the Bhadra reservoir (186 ft). From here the river continues its journey through the city of Bhadravathi, Karnataka. The Bhadra meets the Tunga River at Koodli, a small town near Shivamogga. The combined river continues east as the Tungabhadra, a major tributary of the Krishna, which empties into the Bay of Bengal.

External links

Map of Bhadra River
Noisy scenes at meeting of Bhadra farmers, officials
 Jabir bhr (Online Guide)
Assessing Irrigation Performance of Rice-Based Bhadra Project in India
Crocodiles are abundant in the Bhadra river

Rivers of Karnataka
Geography of Chikkamagaluru district
Rivers of India